Just in Time is an American sitcom that aired from April 6 until May 11, 1988.

Premise
Harry Stadlin is the new editor of West Coast Review, a magazine in California. The magazine has a talented staff with complicated personal and professional lives.

Cast
Tim Matheson as Harry Stadlin
Patricia Kalember as Joanna Farrell
Alan Blumenfeld as Steven Birnbaum
Kevin Scannell as Jack Manning
Nada Despotovich as Isabel Miller
Ronnie Claire Edwards as Carly Hightower
Patrick Breen as Nick Thompson

Episodes

References

External links

1988 American television series debuts
1988 American television series endings
1980s American sitcoms
English-language television shows
Television shows set in California
American Broadcasting Company original programming
Television series by Warner Bros. Television Studios